Nazan Bulut (born 24 May 1973) is a Turkish former women's footballer. She was a member of the Turkey women's national teams. She is a teacher for physical education.

Nazan Bulut was born at Akçalören village of İvrindi district in Balıkesir Province, western Turkey on May 24, 1973.

She serves as a teacher for physical education in the special education and rehabilitation center in Çamlık, Denizli.

Playing career

Club
Bulut began her football playing career in the Ankara-based club Gürtaşspor on March 30, 1995. In the second half of the 1996–97 season, she transferred to Dinarsuspor in Istanbul.

International
Bulut was admitted to the Turkey women's team, and debuted in the friendly match against Romania on 8 September 1995. She played in five matches of the UEFA Women's Euro 1997 qualification – Group 8 against Hungary, Bulgaria and Ukraine in 1995 and 1996. She scored the only goal of Turkey in the match against Hungary on 9 May 1996. She capped seven times for the Turkey national team.

References

Living people
1973 births
People from İvrindi
Turkish women's footballers
Turkey women's international footballers
Turkish schoolteachers
Dinarsuspor players
Women's association footballers not categorized by position